The Charles Spangenberg Farmstead is a historic farm in Woodbury, Minnesota, United States, established in 1869.  The three oldest buildings, including an 1871 farmhouse, were listed together on the National Register of Historic Places in 1978 for having local significance in the theme of agriculture.  The property was nominated for being one of Washington County's few remaining 19th-century farmsteads.

Description
Charles Spangenberg's farm originally constituted . The farm buildings are clustered together on a  lot on top of a knoll. Only the three oldest buildings date to Spangenberg's occupancy: the farmhouse, a barn, and a granary. The house was constructed of limestone in 1871. It has three stories plus a walkout basement, having been built into a slope. In recent years the house has been expanded with a new wing, a garage, and dormers for additional headroom in the attic.

The two-story granary was constructed around 1875.  A larger barn for the Spangenbergs' horses and dairy cattle was built around 1887.  Both are timber-framed structures with board-and-batten siding, on limestone foundations.  The barn was also built into a slope, providing walk-in access both to the level for livestock and the level for hay storage.

Additional farm structures were constructed in the first half of the 20th century, including a chicken coop, ice house, wind-powered water pump, milk house, privy, and smoke house.  As of 2015 a pump house built around 1925 and a steel silo constructed in 1940 still stood on the property.

History
With his brother Frederick he began building a house, quarrying limestone from bluffs overlooking the Mississippi River and hauling it with a team of horses and a stone-boat. Charles and his family lived in the house's foundation until construction was complete in 1871.

The Spangenbergs mostly grew potatoes and grain, the usual produce of the area's farms.  The property remained in the family until 1901, when it was sold to the Czikalla family.  They built a number of additional structures and shifted primarily to dairy farming.

The property stayed in the Czikalla family for over a century, changing hands for only the third time when it was put up for auction in 2008.  The new owners have been gradually restoring the historic wing of the house, as well as expanding the Czikallas' more recent additions.

See also
 National Register of Historic Places listings in Washington County, Minnesota

Notes

References

1869 establishments in Minnesota
Buildings and structures in Washington County, Minnesota
Farms on the National Register of Historic Places in Minnesota
German-American culture in Minnesota
Houses completed in 1871
Limestone buildings in the United States
National Register of Historic Places in Washington County, Minnesota